The Supreme Council of the Republic of Khakassia is the regional parliament of Khakassia, a federal subject of Russia. A total of 50 deputies are elected for five-year terms.

The presiding officer is the Chairman of the Supreme Council of the Republic of Khakassia.

Elections

2018

See also
List of chairmen of the Supreme Council of Khakassia

References

External links
The Khakasia Republic

Khakassia, Republic of
Politics of Khakassia
Khakassia, Republic of